The New South Wales Department of Prisons, later the Department of Corrective Services (DCS), was a State government agency in New South Wales, Australia, that managed prisons, parole and community service. Established in 1874 as the Department of Prisons, DCS was absorbed into the State Department of Justice and Attorney General in 2009.

History

Before 1874 

Great Britain started the European settlement of the Colony of New South Wales in 1788, establishing a penal colony at what is now Sydney. The incentive to establishment the colony came from the conclusion (1783) of the American War of Independence, which forced Britain to find ways of dealing with criminals other than transporting them to North America. The initial settlement at Sydney Cove in Port Jackson involved housing convicts in tents, guarded by marines. Further convict shipments followed, and a surge of convicts arrived in Sydney after the Napoleonic Wars ended in 1815. Convicts worked for pay and, where good behaviour was demonstrated, could be assigned to masters. Chain gangs operated from 1826 up until transportation ended in 1840.

In the colony's early years, prisons and executions were managed first by the provost marshal, a military officer, and then, from 1824, by the sheriff.

Department of Prisons 
The colony established its first Department of Prisons in 1874, with Sheriff Harold Maclean appointed as the first Comptroller-General.

Department of Corrective Services 
The department changed its name to 'Corrective Services' in 1970, and McGeechan's title changed to Commissioner. Eight years later, the Wran Government accepted the Royal Commission's recommendation that the post of commissioner be abolished in favour of a three-person Corrective Services Commission.

The Government appointed academic Tony Vinson as the chairman of the new Corrective Services Commission. Vinson implemented many of the Royal Commission recommendations, but by 1981 found himself in conflict with the officers' union, the Public Service Association. The Government backed the union in the dispute, and Vinson retired to academia. The tenure of his replacement, Vern Dalton, was memorable for a corruption scandal that saw the Minister for Corrections, Rex Jackson, sentenced to 10 years' gaol for corruption.

Labor, tarnished by this and other scandals, was swept from office in 1988: the Liberal–Nationals coalition that replaced them campaigned on a 'tough on crime' platform. Dalton was moved to a different department and the Corrective Services Commission was abolished in favour of a single director-general on 9 August 1988. The first director-general was former police officer Angus Graham.

In October 1991 the department was restructured, with its juvenile justice responsibilities being transferred to a separate agency and Graham's title changed to Commissioner.

As part of a broader consolidation of government departments in 2009, the Department of Corrective Services was merged with the departments of the Attorney-General and Juvenile Justice in 2009.  Corrective Services New South Wales became a division of what is now known as the Department of Justice, with Woodham retaining his role as Commissioner.

Past chief executives 
List of past Commissioners for New South Wales

See also 
 New South Wales Department of Justice
 New South Wales Department of Communities and Justice
 Royal Commission into New South Wales Prisons
 Punishment in Australia
 List of prisons in Australia
 GEO Group
 Management and Training Corporation
 Serco

References 

Corrective Services
Legal organisations based in Australia
1874 establishments in Australia
2009 disestablishments in Australia
Government agencies established in 1874
Government agencies disestablished in 2009